Radion Kertanti (born 9 January 1971) is a Slovak wrestler. He competed at the 1996 Summer Olympics and the 2000 Summer Olympics.

References

External links
 

1971 births
Living people
People from Irafsky District
Slovak male sport wrestlers
Olympic wrestlers of Slovakia
Wrestlers at the 1996 Summer Olympics
Wrestlers at the 2000 Summer Olympics